The men's 100 metre backstroke S6 event at the 2012 Paralympic Games took place on 30 August, at the London Aquatics Centre.

Two heats were held, one with six swimmers and one with seven swimmers. The swimmers with the eight fastest times advanced to the final.

Heats

Heat 1

Heat 2

Final

References

Men's 100m Backstroke - S6 Final Result 

Swimming at the 2012 Summer Paralympics